SER-601 (COR-167) is a drug which acts as a potent and selective cannabinoid CB2 receptor agonist, based on a quinolone-3-carboxylic acid core structure, with 190 times selectivity for CB2 over the related CB1 receptor. It has analgesic effects in animal studies, as well as neuroprotective effects, but without a "cannabis high" due to its low affinity for CB1. A number of related compounds are known, almost all of which have high selectivity for CB2.

See also
 A-836,339
 CBS-0550

References 

Cannabinoids
Adamantanes
4-Quinolones
Carboxamides
Enones